Lucidestea is a genus of minute sea snails, marine gastropod mollusks or micromollusks in the family Rissoidae.

Species
Species within the genus Lucidestea include:
 Lucidestea vitrea Laseron, 1956

References

 Ponder W. F. (1985). A review of the Genera of the Rissoidae (Mollusca: Mesogastropoda: Rissoacea). Records of the Australian Museum supplement 4: 1–221-page(s): 50–51

Rissoidae
Monotypic gastropod genera